Mastigostyla is a genus of flowering plants in the family Iridaceae, first described as a genus in 1928. The entire group is endemic to South America. The genus name is derived from the Greek words mastigos, meaning "whip", and stylos, meaning "style".

 Species
 Mastigostyla boliviensis (R.C.Foster) Goldblatt, Iris Family: 247 (2008). - Bolivia
 Mastigostyla brachiandra Ravenna, Revista Inst. Munic. Bot. 2: 57 (1964). - Salta in Argentina
 Mastigostyla brevicaulis (Baker) R.C.Foster, Contr. Gray Herb. 161: 16 (1946). - Bolivia
 Mastigostyla cabrerae R.C.Foster, Contr. Gray Herb. 171: 25 (1950). - Jujuy + Salta in Argentina
 Mastigostyla candaravensis Ravenna - Tacna in Peru
 Mastigostyla cardenasii R.C.Foster, Contr. Gray Herb. 155: 23 (1945). - Bolivia, Cusco in Peru
 Mastigostyla chuquisacensis Huaylla & Wilkin - Bolivia
 Mastigostyla cyrtophylla I.M.Johnst., Contr. Gray Herb. 81: 85 (1928). - Arequipa in Peru
 Mastigostyla gracilis R.C.Foster, Rhodora 14: 296 (1962). - Chile, Bolivia
 Mastigostyla herrerae (Vargas) Ravenna, Revista Inst. Munic. Bot. 2: 56 (1964). - Cusco in Peru
 Mastigostyla hoppii R.C.Foster, Contr. Gray Herb. 155: 24 (1945). - Arequipa in Peru
 Mastigostyla humilis Ravenna, Bol. Soc. Argent. Bot. 10: 316 (1965). - Cusco in Peru
 Mastigostyla implicata Ravenna, Revista Inst. Munic. Bot. 2: 58 (1964). - Jujuy in Argentina
 Mastigostyla johnstonii R.C.Foster, Contr. Gray Herb. 155: 25 (1945). - Tucumán in Argentina
 Mastigostyla longituba (R.C.Foster) Ravenna - Bolivia
 Mastigostyla macbridei (R.C.Foster) Ravenna, Revista Inst. Munic. Bot. 2: 56 (1964). - Lima + Junín in Peru
 Mastigostyla major Ravenna, Revista Inst. Munic. Bot. 2: 56 (1964). - Apurímac + Ayacucho in Peru
 Mastigostyla mirabilis Ravenna, Revista Inst. Munic. Bot. 2: 57 (1964). - Tucumán in Argentina
 Mastigostyla orurensis (R.C.Foster) Ravenna - Bolivia
 Mastigostyla peruviana R.C.Foster, Contr. Gray Herb. 171: 25 (1950). - Apurímac in Peru
 Mastigostyla potosina R.C.Foster, Rhodora 64: 294 (1962). - Bolivia
 Mastigostyla shepardiae (R.C.Foster) Ravenna - Puno in Peru
 Mastigostyla spathacea (Griseb.) Ravenna, Bol. Soc. Argent. Bot. 10: 317 (1965) - northern Argentina
 Mastigostyla torotoroensis Huaylla & Wilkin - Bolivia
 Mastigostyla tunariensis (R.C.Foster) Ravenna - Bolivia
 Mastigostyla venturii (R.C.Foster) Ravenna - Jujuy + Tucumán in Argentina
 Mastigostyla woodii Huaylla & Wilkin - Bolivia

References

Iridaceae genera
Flora of South America
Iridaceae